Nikita Aleksandrovich Kovalyov (born 31 March 1996) is a Russian football player.

Club career
He made his debut in the Russian Premier League for FC Rostov on 20 August 2016 in a game against FC Tom Tomsk.

References

External links
 

1996 births
Living people
Russian footballers
Association football defenders
FC Rostov players
Russian Premier League players
FC Dynamo Bryansk players